Lindum Hockey Club is a field hockey club located in Lincoln, England. The club was formed in the Spring of 2015, a merger between Lincoln Hockey Club and Lincoln Roses Hockey Club. Lindum Hockey Clubs plays its home games at the Lindum Sports Association on St Giles Avenue in Lincoln.

The Men's 1st Team play in the North Hockey Association Premier Division, while the Ladies 1st Team play in the North Hockey Association Division One. The majority of the other teams compete in the Yorkshire Hockey League. As Lincoln's only field hockey club, the club fields seven men's teams, including two development sides, five ladies' teams, a veterans side, two mixed teams, and has a well established junior hockey section.

History 
Despite being founded only relatively recently, the club's history stretches back over a combined 200-year period. Lincoln Roses Hockey Club began life as a part of the Sports Club of Rose Brothers (Gainsborough) Limited, a manufacturer of sweet wrapping equipment. Gainsborough Rose Hockey Club, as they were known at the time following an amalgamation with Gainsborough Ladies Hockey Club, started to take on organised hockey with the formation of the Lincolnshire Hockey League. Later, with the advent of artificial turf becoming the de facto playing surface in the sport, facilities were sought in Lincoln and in time a formal link with Lincoln University saw the club renamed Lincoln Roses Hockey Club.

Lincoln Hockey Club was built on the foundations of Lincoln Ladies Hockey Club, started in 1898. The club's first links with the Lindum Sports Association came about in 1946 where the men's club was also formerly created - named Lincoln Imps Hockey Club. The Lindum Sports Association was to be the base for both hockey clubs over the next 43 years before the need to use artificial turf took the club elsewhere in the city for their home games. In 1980 the two clubs were merged to become a single entity, continuing to be called Lincoln Imps Hockey Club, until 1998 when it became simply Lincoln Hockey Club. Olympic medalist and England / Great Britain International player Georgie Twigg is a former player of Lincoln Hockey Club.

The Merger 
An attempt to arrange a merger between Lincoln Roses Hockey Club and Lincoln Hockey Club in the mid to late-2000s proved unsuccessful and the two clubs continued to provide opportunities to play hockey and promote the sport side by side in the same city. In 2013 a purpose-built artificial turf hockey pitch was laid at the Lindum Sports Association, in part funded by England Hockey and Sport England. Some of the logic behind the funding of the new facility was that two hockey clubs would benefit and so both Lincoln Hockey Club and Lincoln Roses Hockey Club were playing most of their home games at the same location. In early 2014, a team consisting of Gary Johnson, John Harrison, Mark Sadler and John Sisman put in place the plans and foundations for a merger of the two clubs. Extraordinary General Meetings were called at both clubs to present a vision for the future of hockey in Lincoln and, with that, both clubs formerly dissolved on 8 June 2015 and, on the same date, Lindum Hockey Club was created in their place.

Branding 
In order to strike a balance between the two clubs, the decision was made to start afresh with branding. The new club name wouldn't involve any merging of the two former names but instead adopt the name used at the Lindum Sports Association, which is also used by other member clubs using the same facilities (the Lindum Cricket Club and Lindum Squash Club). The logo was inspired by Lindum Cricket Club's logo; the Roman of the 9th Roman Legion who founded Lindum Colonia.

2015/2016 season 
As well as the successful merger of the two former hockey clubs in the season, the season saw an affiliation in excess of 720 players. The Men's 1st Team also played Beeston Hockey Club at home in a cup clash that saw record crowds at the pitch-side, and the club organised and ran a successful Fireworks Event at the Lindum Sports Association.

References

External links 
 Lindum Hockey Club's Official Website
 Lindum Hockey Club heralds new era for the sport in Lincoln

2015 establishments in England
English field hockey clubs
Field hockey clubs established in 2015
Sport in Lincoln, England